Self Determination Music is an album by American jazz saxophonist John Carter and trumpeter Bobby Bradford released by the Flying Dutchman label in 1970.

Track listing
All compositions by John Carter except where noted
 "The Sunday Afternoon Jazz Blues Society" − 5:50
 "The Eye of the Storm" (Bobby Bradford) − 15:21
 "Loneliness" − 9:10
 "Encounter" − 13:27

Personnel
John Carter − alto saxophone, tenor saxophone, clarinet
Bobby Bradford − cornet
Henry Franklin, Tom Williamson − bass
Bruz Freeman − drums

References

John Carter (jazz musician) albums
Bobby Bradford albums
1970 albums
Flying Dutchman Records albums